Audrey Anderson may refer to:

Audrey Marie Anderson (born 1975), American actress and model
Audrey J. Anderson, American attorney
Audrey Anderson, character in the 2020 film  Legion